Symbiodiniaceae is a family of marine dinoflagellates notable for their symbiotic associations with reef-building corals, sea anemones, jellyfish, marine sponges, giant clams, acoel flatworms, and other marine invertebrates. Symbiotic Symbiodiniaceae are sometimes colloquially referred to as Zooxanthellae, though the latter term can be interpreted to include other families of symbiotic algae as well. While many Symbiodiniaceae species are endosymbionts, others are free living in the water column or sediment.

Most symbiotic members of Symbiodiniaceae were previously assigned to the genus Symbiodinium; however, recent genetic analysis has led to a taxonomic reorganization with several former members of Symbiodinium (previously "clades") reassigned to new genera within the Symbiodiniaceae family. Species formerly classified within Symbiodinum Clade A are retained in the Symbiodinium genus.

Genera   

There are eleven accepted genera in this family:
Symbiodinium 
Breviolum 
Cladocopium 
Durusdinium 
 Freudenthalidium 
 Halluxium
Miliolidium

References 

Taxa described in 1993
Dinoflagellate families
Dinophyceae